Royal Air Force Deenethorpe or more simply RAF Deenethorpe is a former Royal Air Force station located  east of Corby, Northamptonshire, England. It has one remaining tarmac runway at 1200m (3937ft) long.

United States Army Air Forces use
Deenethorpe was constructed in 1943 and was allocated to the  United States Army Air Forces Eighth Air Force.  It was assigned USAAF designation Station 128.

USAAF Station Units assigned to RAF Deenethorpe were: 
 450th Sub-Depot
 431st Air Service Group
 681st Air Materiel Squadron
 857th Air Engineering Squadron 
 18th Weather Squadron
 78th Station Complement Squadron
 831st Engineer Aviation Battalion
 1199th Military Police Company
 1209th Quartermaster Company
 1597th Ordnance Supply & Maintenance Company
 861st Chemical Company (Air Operations)
 2095th Engineer Fire Fighting Platoon

401st Bombardment Group (Heavy) 
With the opening of the airfield  in October 1943, the 401st Bombardment Group (Heavy), arrived from Great Falls AAB, Montana, in November.  The 401st was assigned to the 94th Combat Bombardment Wing of the 1st Bombardment Division.  Its tail code was Triangle-S.

The 401st Bomb Group consisted of the following operational squadrons flying Boeing B-17 Flying Fortresss :
 612th Bombardment Squadron (SC)
 613th Bombardment Squadron (IN)
 614th Bombardment Squadron (IW)
 615th Bombardment Squadron (IY)

The 401st BG operated chiefly against strategic targets, bombing industries, submarine facilities, shipyards, missile sites, marshalling yards, and airfields; beginning in October 1944, concentrated on oil reserves. The Group received a Distinguished Unit Citation for striking telling blows against German aircraft production on 11 January and 20 February 1944.

In addition to strategic missions, group operations included attacks on transportation, airfields, and fortifications prior to the Normandy invasion and on D-Day, June 1944; support for ground operations during the breakthrough at Saint-Lô in July, the siege of Brest in August, and the airborne attack on the Netherlands in September 1944.

The Group flew missions against enemy forces during the Battle of the Bulge, December 1944 - January 1945, by assaulting transportation targets and communications centres in the battle area; and support for the airborne attack across the Rhine in March 1945.

The worst accident occurred on 5 December 1943 when a Fortress which failed to get off the ground careered over farmland and came to rest after crashing into a cottage on the edge of Deenethorpe village. The surviving members of the crew just had time to evacuate the wreckage and warn the villagers of the imminent explosion of the bomb load before it detonated damaging many houses in the village. The blast was felt in Kettering nine miles away.

After V-E Day, the group departed from Deenethorpe in August 1945 and returned to Sioux Falls AAF where the unit was inactivated, personnel demobilized and B-17 aircraft sent to storage.

The 401st Bombardment Group had flown 255 combat missions from Deenethorpe airfield.

Postwar use
After the war, Deenethorpe was used as a RAF Recruiting Centre, and later for several years the control tower was used as a lookout post by the local Royal Observer Corps. It was finally sold in 1963 and largely returned to agriculture.  Part of the old main runway is now used as a private airstrip.

The  airfield is one of the sites that has been approved for a "garden village" in 2017. The plans include a village green, shops and community hall, as well as more than 1,000 homes.

Postscript
On 17 June 2011, the widow of an American air crewman who took part in bombing raids from the airfield buried a time capsule on the crew's behalf. Joan Parker was married to Tom Parker, the last surviving crew member of the B-17 Lady Luck of the 401st Bombardment Squadron. In a ceremony, Mrs. Parker buried eight glass-bottomed tankards along with a story of the men at the airfield. The crew carried out raids on marshalling yards in Berlin. "It was all agreed that whoever was the last one would bring the tankards back to Deenethorpe," she said. "It took some time trying to gather all of the information." The tankards were a gift from the pilot of Lady Luck, Lt. Bob Kamper, who presented them to the crew at a reunion in 1972. Mr. Parker died in March 2011.

See also

List of former Royal Air Force stations

References

Citations

Bibliography
 Freeman, Roger A. (1978) Airfields of the Eighth: Then and Now. After the Battle 
 Freeman, Roger A. (1991) The Mighty Eighth The Colour Record. Cassell & Co. 
 Maurer, Maurer (1983). Air Force Combat Units Of World War II. Maxwell AFB, Alabama: Office of Air Force History. .
 Rogers, Brian (2005). United States Air Force Unit Designations Since 1978. Hinkley, England: Midland Publications. .
   www.controltowers.co.uk Deenethorpe
 mighty8thaf.preller.us Deenethorpe
 USAAS-USAAC-USAAF-USAF Aircraft Serial Numbers--1908 to present

External links

 401st Bomb Group website
 Deenethorpe Today photo album
 Historic Deenethorpe photo album

Airfields of the VIII Bomber Command in the United Kingdom
Royal Air Force stations in Northamptonshire